A status conference is a court-ordered meeting with a judge (or under some circumstances an authorized counsel) where they decide the date of the trial or to get updated information on a defendant for ongoing conditions, set forth previously by the courts such as house arrest or home monitoring.

If a party does not attend the status conference, that party's requests for scheduling changes will be ignored. If the plaintiff and/or a representative of plaintiff does not attend the status conference, the action may be dismissed.

Civil procedure